"Thrown Away" is a 1981 song by The Stranglers. It was the first single from their concept album, The Gospel According to the Meninblack. This was The Stranglers' attempt at a Euro disco song, and the band were confident it would be a hit. However, despite an appearance on Top of the Pops, it could only reach No. 42 in the UK Singles Chart, and continued a two-year period of relative commercial decline for the band.

References

The Stranglers songs
1981 singles
1980 songs